GO (previously GO NYC), is a "cultural roadmap for the city girl," and is the nation's most widely distributed, free, lesbian magazine. Based out of New York City, GO distributes 30,000 copies in 10 major cities, and receives 250,000 unique web hits monthly. The publication offers information on nightlife, arts & entertainment, news & current events, lifestyle, travel, advice, and celebrity Q&As. 

GO was founded in 2001 by publisher Amy Lesser.

See also
 LGBT culture in New York City

References

External links
 Official website

LGBT-related magazines published in the United States
Free magazines
Lesbian-related magazines
Magazines established in 2001
Magazines published in New York City